Strangers in the Wind is a 1978 rock album by the Bay City Rollers.  It was the group's sixth original studio album, and second consecutive disc to feature the production work of Harry Maslin, who produced hits for Air Supply.

Early 1978 had seen a reunion of the Rollers' most successful line-up as bassist Alan Longmuir, a founding member, re-joined the band after a two-year hiatus, now on rhythm guitar.  The group timed the release of their new album to coincide with their very own network television series, The Krofft Superstar Hour Starring the Bay City Rollers, a Saturday morning NBC show.

Unfortunately, the kiddie format did little to push record sales for the Rollers, who were over two years removed from their phenomenon stage.  The lush, mature soft-rock of Strangers in the Wind did not find an audience, and each of three singles failed to hit the U.S. charts.  The most successful single from the album, "Where Will I Be Now," was a minor hit in Germany.

The band regrouped again with another new line-up and a name change for 1979's Elevator.

Strangers in the Wind was reissued on CD with 1 bonus track in October 2007 ("All of the World Is Falling in Love (single version)").

Track listing

Side one
"Another Rainy Day in New York City" (Eric Faulkner, Stuart Wood)
"All of the World Is Falling in Love" (Faulkner, Wood)
"Where Will I Be Now" (Chris East)
"Back on the Street" (Faulkner, Wood)
"Strangers in the Wind" (Faulkner, Wood)

Side two
"Love Brought Me Such a Magical Thing" (Barry Kirsch, Charlie Spencer)
"If You Were My Woman" (Faulkner, Wood)
"Every Tear I Cry" (Iain Sutherland)
"Shoorah Shoorah for Hollywood" (Faulkner, Wood)
"When I Say I Love You (The Pie)" (Iain Sutherland)

Charts

Personnel

Group members
Eric Faulkner – Lead guitars, acoustic guitars, vocoder, Roland synth-guitar, harmony vocals, lead vocal on "Back on the Street"
Alan Longmuir – Rhythm & acoustic guitars, synthesizer, harmony vocals
Derek Longmuir – Drums, vocals
Les McKeown – Lead vocals, harmonies
Stuart "Woody" Wood – Bass, saxophone, harmony vocals, lead vocal on "Magical Thing"

Other personnel
Harry Maslin – producer
David Richards – engineer
Martin Pearson – assistant engineer
Barry Fasman – strings and brass arrangements
Richard Belis – vocal arrangements
Nicky Hopkins – keyboards
Neal Preston – photography
Bob Iwanicki – sleeve illustrator

Other information
Recorded at Mountain Studios, Montreux, Switzerland
Given its first wide CD release in 2008 on the 7Ts label

References

Bay City Rollers albums
1978 albums
Arista Records albums